Chiltiupán is a municipality in the La Libertad department of El Salvador.

Located 55 km. southwest of San Salvador. 
Population: 25,000 in 29 cantons. 
 
Average annual income: $600, $1.64 per day. 
Average family size: 4-6 children. 
Unemployment rate is high.

The Santo Domingo School was destroyed by earthquakes in 2001. Today, 950 children attend classes in the new school built with a grant from Aid to International Development. Forty percent of the children need assistance to attend classes.

Since 1964, the Diocese of Cleveland has sent priests, sisters and lay women to serve the people of El Salvador as part of the Cleveland Latin American Mission Team (CLAM). Today five priests and one Ursuline Sister serve the most forgotten people in four different regiong: Chiltiupàn, El Carmen, La Libertad and Teotepeque.

Municipalities of the La Libertad Department (El Salvador)